The 2018 Blancpain GT Series Endurance Cup was the eighth season of the Blancpain GT Series Endurance Cup. The season began on 22 April at Monza and ended on 30 September in Barcelona. The season featured five rounds, with each race lasting for a duration of three hours besides the 24 Hours of Spa and the 1000 km Paul Ricard events.

Calendar
At the annual press conference during the 2017 24 Hours of Spa on 28 July, the Stéphane Ratel Organisation announced the first draft of the 2018 calendar. No changes were made to the schedule compared to 2017. On 17 September 2017, it was announced the race at Silverstone was moved a week to avoid a clash with the Nürburgring 24 Hours.

Entry list
On 2 October 2017, it was announced grids would be limited to 26 Pro class entries, in an effort to make the championship more attractive to Pro-Am and Am class competitors. The entry cap was in place for all races except for the 24 Hours of Spa.

Race results
Bold indicates overall winner.

Championship standings
Scoring system
Championship points were awarded for the first ten positions in each race. The pole-sitter also received one point and entries were required to complete 75% of the winning car's race distance in order to be classified and earn points. Individual drivers were required to participate for a minimum of 25 minutes in order to earn championship points in any race.

Race points

1000 km Paul Ricard points

24 Hours of Spa points
Points were awarded after six hours, after twelve hours and at the finish.

Drivers' championships

Overall

Notes
1 – The No. 11 Kessel Racing Ferrari remained in race results at Monza, but was considered invisible and ineligible for points in the Drivers' and Teams' championships. Alessandro Pier Guidi was forced to exceed his maximum driver time, due to an injury suffered by his co-driver Michał Broniszewski in the paddock.

Silver Cup

Pro-Am Cup

Notes
1 – The No. 11 Kessel Racing Ferrari remained in race results at Monza, but was considered invisible and ineligible for points in the Drivers' and Teams' championships. Alessandro Pier Guidi was forced to exceed his maximum driver time, due to an injury suffered by his co-driver Michał Broniszewski in the paddock.

Am Cup

Teams' championships

Overall

Notes
1 – The No. 11 Kessel Racing Ferrari remained in race results at Monza, but was considered invisible and ineligible for points in the Drivers' and Teams' championships. Alessandro Pier Guidi was forced to exceed his maximum driver time, due to an injury suffered by his co-driver Michał Broniszewski in the paddock.

Pro-Am Cup

Notes
1 – The No. 11 Kessel Racing Ferrari remained in race results at Monza, but was considered invisible and ineligible for points in the Drivers' and Teams' championships. Alessandro Pier Guidi was forced to exceed his maximum driver time, due to an injury suffered by his co-driver Michał Broniszewski in the paddock.

Am Cup

See also
2018 Blancpain GT Series
2018 Blancpain GT Series Sprint Cup
2018 Blancpain GT Series Asia

Notes

References

External links

Endurance Cup